Alizé Cornet was the defending champion, but lost to Anna Karolína Schmiedlová in the quarterfinals.

Schmiedlová went on to win her first WTA title, defeating Camila Giorgi in the final, 6–4, 6–3.

Seeds

Draw

Finals

Top half

Bottom half

Qualifying

Seeds

Qualifiers

Lucky losers 
  Elizaveta Kulichkova

Draw

First qualifier

Second qualifier

Third qualifier

Fourth qualifier

References
Main Draw
Qualifying Draw

Katowice Open - Singles
2015 Singles